In the United States, the concept of a working class remains vaguely defined, and classifying people or jobs into this class can be contentious. Economists and pollsters in the United States generally define "working class" adults as those lacking a college degree,  rather than by occupation or income.  Many members of the working class, as defined by academic models, are often identified in the vernacular as being middle-class, there is considerable ambiguity over the term's meaning. According to Frank Newport, "for some, working class is a more literal label; namely, an indication that one is working." Sociologists such as Dennis Gilbert and Joseph Kahl see the working class as the most populous in the United States, while other sociologists such as William Thompson, Joseph Hickey and James Henslin deem the lower middle class slightly more populous. In the class models devised by these sociologists, the working class comprises between 30% and 35% of the population, roughly the same percentages as the lower middle class. According to the class model by Dennis Gilbert, the working class comprises those between the 25th and 55th percentile of society. In 2018, 31% of Americans self described themselves as working class. Retired American adults are less likely to describe themselves as "working class", regardless of the actual income or education level of the adult. Those in the working class are commonly employed in clerical, retail sales, and low-skill manual labor occupations. Low-level white-collar workers are included in this class.

For purposes of political science, and less scientific or journalistic political analysis, defining the working class as less well educated workers is useful. One can then meaningfully analyze the political opinions and political behavior of, say, the white working class in the United States. In the case of the United States, for example, the white working class is often defined as "white" (i.e. non-Hispanic) workers who have not completed college.

Recent history

Since the 1970s, economic and occupational insecurity has become a major problem for American workers, their families, and their communities. While outsourcing, the busting and decline of unionization and welfare supports, the rise of immigration, the prison-industrial complex, and unemployment have brought increased competition and considerable economic insecurity to working-class employees in the "traditional" blue-collar fields, there is an increasing demand for service personnel, including clerical and retail occupations. Sociologist Gosta Esping-Anderson describes these supervised service occupations as "junk jobs," as they fail to pay living wages in the face of asset and price inflation, fail to pay benefits, are often insecure, unstable, or temporary, and provide little work control and little opportunity for skill development or advancement. In contrast to other expensive countries with higher proportions of quality jobs, the U.S. has developed an economy where two-thirds of jobs do not require or reward higher education; the other one-third of jobs consist largely in managing the junk job workers. Recalling this American labor market reality as well as the high cost of higher education in the US, lower educational attainment can be a rational calculation. The alternative is probably not a better job. It is the junk job, with educational debt added on top. In fact, even if more Americans were to become highly educated, there would be more competition for the relatively few high-quality jobs, and those wages would decline. This suggests that the middle and working classes in the US may not be distinct classes, but rather opposing subgroups of the same class.

Despite, or perhaps because of the well-known limitations that the US labor market, inequality—including deep educational inequality, and other structural factors set on social mobility in the US, many commentators find more interesting the idea of class cultures. Education, for example, can pose an especially intransigent barrier in the US, and not just because of gross educational inequality; culture plays some role as well. The middle class is often recognized in the US by educational attainment, which is correlated with (but may not cause) income and wealth, especially for white men. Members of the working class commonly have a high school diploma and many have only some college education. Due to differences between middle and working class cultures, working class college students may face culture shock upon entering the post-secondary education system, with its "middle class" culture.

Some researchers try to measure the cultural differences between the American middle class and working class and suggest their ahistorical sources and implications for educational attainment, future income, and other life chances. Sociologist Melvin Kohn argues that working class values emphasize external standards, such as obedience and a strong respect for authority as well as little tolerance for deviance. This is opposed to middle-class individuals who, he says, emphasize internal standards, self-direction, curiosity and a tolerance for non-conformity.

Other social scientists, such as Barbara Jensen, show that middle-class culture tends to be highly individualistic, while working-class culture tends to center around the community. Such cultural value differences are thought to be closely linked to an individual's occupation. Working-class employees tend to be closely supervised and thus emphasize external values and obedience.

Working class culture can be broken down into subgroup tendencies. According to Rubin (1976), there is a differential in social and emotional skills both between working-class men and women and between the blue-color working-class and college-educated workers. Working-class men are characterized by Rubin as taking a rational posture while women are characterized as being more emotional and oriented towards communication of feelings. This constellation of cultural issues has been explored in the popular media, for example, the television shows, Roseanne or All in the Family featuring Archie Bunker and his wife Edith Bunker. These popular television programs also explored generational change and conflict in working-class families. One does need to note, however, that there are great variations in cultural values among the members of all classes and that any statement pertaining to the cultural values of such large social groups needs to be seen as a broad generalization.

Further, if the hypothesis that culture primarily produces class were true, such a non-dialectical, causal relationship pertains more validly in some low-social mobility societies. Scandinavian countries, by contrast, have discovered that removing structural barriers (and to some extent broadly valorizing working class culture) is effective in increasing social mobility, if not in eradicating social class under capitalism.

Political role of the white working class

According to Thomas B. Edsall, an experienced political commentator, the white working class, defined as non-Hispanic whites who have not completed college, plays a pivotal role in the politics of the United States. This segment of the electorate is large and volatile and its swing vote role closely tracks the success or failure of Democratic candidates. It was solidly Democratic during the New Deal but its support of Democratic candidates has steadily eroded to about 50%. It is also diminishing as a portion of the electorate, both due to increased educational opportunities and because whites make up a declining share of the electorate overall. Reagan Democrats describes the segment of the white working class which forms part of the Republican base of support.

The political role of the white working class was re-examined during the 2016 United States presidential election, due to the strong support for Donald Trump by white working class voters. Trump's victory was in part credited to this support in swing states such as Wisconsin, Michigan, and Pennsylvania, that had previously been won by his Democratic predecessor Barack Obama. Professional pollsters did not predict such a large swing for Trump among the white working class. According to Nate Cohn, the gains that Trump's opponent Hillary Clinton made among other voter classes "were overwhelmed by Mr. Trump's huge appeal to white voters without a degree." Voter turnout among white voters who did not have a college degree had increased by 3 percent from 2012 to 2016., despite the composition of white voters who did not have a college degree decreasing by 1 percent from 2012 to 2016. Florida saw an even larger increase, with voter turnout among white voters without a college degree increasing almost 7 percent from 2012 to 2016. In North Carolina, voter turnout in 2016 by this demographic increasing more than 4 percent compared to 2012.

According to Lynn Vavreck and colleagues, survey data revealed that economic insecurities mattered to Trump voters most when connected to a racial animus, with the job losses being specifically important when lost to an out-group, in a composite they called 'racialized economics'. Trump supporters have in turn been claimed to have actually have their jobs threatened by Trump's policies, but have continued supporting him. Jonathan Metzl has claimed that low-income white men in Missouri, Tennessee and Kansas oppose policies that support people in their position because they believe that undeserving groups would benefit from them. Arlie Russell Hochschild has studied working-class people in Louisiana, and come to the conclusion that what is motivating them is a feeling, which she calls the Deep Story:You are patiently standing in a long line leading up a hill, as in a pilgrimage. You are situated in the middle of this line, along with others who are also white, older, Christian, predominantly male, some with college degrees, some not. Just over the brow of the hill is the American Dream, the goal of everyone waiting in line.... You've suffered long hours, layoffs, and exposure to dangerous chemicals at work, and received reduced pensions. You have shown moral character through trial by fire, and the American Dream of prosperity and security is a reward for all of this, showing who you have been and are—a badge of honor.... 

Look! You see people cutting in line ahead of you! You're following the rules. They aren't. As they cut in, it feels like you are being moved back. How can they just do that? Who are they? Some are black. Through affirmative action plans, pushed by the federal government, they are being given preference for places in colleges and universities, apprenticeships, jobs, welfare payments, and free lunches.... Women, immigrants, refugees, public sector workers—where will it end? Your money is running through a liberal sympathy sieve you don't control or agree with.... But it's people like you who have made this country great. You feel uneasy. It has to be said: the line cutters irritate you.... You are a stranger in your own land. You do not recognize yourself in how others see you. It is a struggle to feel seen and honored.... [Y]ou are slipping backward.

See also

 Diseases of despair
 Social class in the United States
Strangers in Their Own Land
 Working: People Talk About What They Do All Day and How They Feel About What They Do – extensive oral history from American workers in the 1970s
White trash

Notes

Further reading
 
Rubin, Lillian Breslow, Worlds of Pain: Life in the Working Class Family, Basic Books (1976), hardcover ; trade paperback, 268 pages, 
Shipler, David K., The Working Poor: Invisible in America, Knopf (2004), hardcover, 322 pages, 
Zweig, Michael, Working Class Majority: America's Best Kept Secret, Cornell University Press (2001), trade paperback, 198 pages, 
"America's Forgotten Majority" Joel Rogers and Ruy Teixeira, The Atlantic June, 2000
Joel Townsley Rogers, Joel Rogers, America's Forgotten Majority: Why the White Working Class Still Matters, Basic Books (June 2000), hardcover, 232 pages,  
"White Working Chaos" blog by Thomas B. Edsall in The New York Times June 25, 2012
Mortality and morbidity in the 21st century. Report by Angus Deaton and Anne Case for the Brookings Institution, March 23, 2017.

 
Labor in the United States